The Memorial to the victims of Communism is a series of statues in Prague commemorating the victims of the communist era between 1948 and 1989. It is located at the base of Petřín hill, Újezd street in the Malá Strana or the Lesser Town area.

It was unveiled on the 22 May 2002, twelve years after the fall of communism in the Eastern Bloc, and is the work of Czech sculptor Olbram Zoubek and architects Jan Kerel and Zdeněk Holzel. It was supported by the local council and Confederation of Political Prisoners (KPV).

Description
It shows six bronze copies of a single individual, standing on a flight of stairs, each statue in a different stage of the individual's destruction. The statues appear more "decayed" the further away they are from you - losing limbs and their bodies breaking open. It symbolises how political prisoners were affected by Communism.

There is also a bronze strip that runs along the centre of the memorial, showing estimated numbers of those impacted by communism:

 205,486 arrested
 170,938 forced into exile
 4,500 died in prison
 327 shot trying to escape
 248 executed

The bronze plaque nearby reads:
"The memorial to the victims of communism is dedicated to all victims not only those who were jailed or executed but also those whose lives were ruined by totalitarian despotism"

On February 24, 2018, the adjacent pedestrian way to the memorial was named "Alej obětí totality" as suggested to the Prague City Council by Ivan Margolius.

Controversy 
Prior to the memorial being unveiled, there were reports in the local media about an apparent political row over who should attend the ceremony. President Václav Havel, a leading dissident in the communist era was not invited until the last minute, and then declined to attend.

The memorial has not been universally welcomed, with some artists saying the memorial is kitsch and others critical that female figures were not included. One of the statues was damaged during two bomb blasts in 2003. No one has admitted carrying out the attacks.

References

External links 

 Information at prague.net

2002 establishments in the Czech Republic
2002 sculptures
Bronze sculptures in the Czech Republic
Memorials to victims of communism
Monuments and memorials in Prague
Outdoor sculptures in Prague
Statues in Prague
Tourist attractions in Prague
Vandalized works of art
Malá Strana
21st-century architecture in the Czech Republic